Kate Duncan may refer to:
 Kate Duncan (music executive)
 Kate Duncan (furniture maker)